The 2016 Individual Speedway Junior World Championship was the 40th edition of the FIM World motorcycle speedway Under-21 Championships.

It was staged over three rounds, at King's Lynn, Pardubice and Gdańsk. The championship was won by triple Australian Under-21 Champion Max Fricke who become Australia's fifth Under-21 World Champion. Fricke's consistent run over the series in which he finished 3rd in the first two rounds and 2nd in the final round saw him score 46 points. Finishing in second place was Polish rider Krystian Pieszczek with 40 points while British rider Robert Lambert defeated Australia's Jack Holder (the younger brother of 2012 Speedway World Champion Chris Holder) in a run-off in the final round in Poland to claim 3rd place after both riders finished the series on 37 points.

Final series

Classification 
The meeting classification was according to the points scored during the meeting, with the total points scored by each rider during each meeting credited as World Championship points. The FIM Speedway Under 21 World Champion was the rider who collected most World Championship points at the end of the series. In case of a tie between one or more riders in the final overall classification, a run-off decided the 1st, 2nd and 3rd places. For all other placings, the better-placed rider in the last meeting was the better placed rider.

See also 
 2016 Speedway Grand Prix
 2016 Team Speedway Junior World Championship

References 

 
2016
World Individual Junior